ART Teenz (originally ART 3 and ART Children) was one of the first children's channel in the Arab world (before Spacetoon), and part of the ART Network. The channel aimed to contribute to the upbringing of Arab children, by providing them with knowledge, experience, innovation, and awareness of what went on in the world at the time.

The channel provided a great number of Arabic cultural and educational programmes, as well as a big selection of children's television series, of both U.S. and European origins, dubbed in the Arabic language.

ART Teenz's provided modern religious programmes, scientific films and Arab-themed cartoons. The channel ceased operations on  after it first launched.

Arab mass media
Children's television networks
Defunct television channels
Television channels and stations established in 1993
Television channels and stations disestablished in 2008